The Confederate Memorial includes a  Confederate soldier statue atop an arch anchored in the Fulton, Kentucky Fairview Cemetery. Funded in 1902 by the Colonel Ed Crossland Chapter No. 347 of the United Daughters of the Confederacy, the historic monument is the only such monument in Kentucky to feature an arched base, made of rough-hewn limestone.

Details
On the back of the arch it says "Erected by UDC 1902". The  Confederate soldier statue atop the arch is more typical; it is made of zinc, and features a typical Confederate soldier wearing a slouch hat, carrying a canteen and bed roll while resting himself with his rifle. No other monument in Kentucky features a statue atop an arch, making Fulton's monument unique. Inside the arch are the names of the various officers of the Colonel Ed Crossland Chapter No. 347 of the UDC, which funded the monument. The remains of a walkway are on all four sides of the monument. Due to how late it was built, the monument was meant to celebrate the Confederacy, not to mourn it, despite being at the entrance to a cemetery; earlier such monuments in Kentucky had a "funeral" aspect. Behind the arch is a step with the initials UCV, the abbreviation for the United Confederate Veterans. The front step simply says "Confederate", and the side steps say nothing.

On July 17, 1997, it was one of sixty-one different monuments to the Civil War in Kentucky placed on the National Register of Historic Places, as part of the Civil War Monuments of Kentucky Multiple Property Submission.

Gallery

References

1902 sculptures
Civil War Monuments of Kentucky MPS
National Register of Historic Places in Fulton County, Kentucky
United Daughters of the Confederacy monuments and memorials in Kentucky
Zinc sculptures in the United States
1902 establishments in Kentucky